Charles Walter de Vis (Birmingham, England, 9 May 1829 – Brisbane, Queensland, Australia, 30 April 1915), known as Devis before about 1882, was an English zoologist, ornithologist, herpetologist, and botanist.

De Vis gained a BA from Magdelene College, Cambridge in 1849, became a deacon in 1852,  and was rector of Breane, Somerset from 1855 to 1859.
He gave up his ecclesiastical functions to devote himself to science, initially in England then after 1870 in Australia. De Vis also wrote under the name of Thickthorn, the name of his home in Rockhampton.

He was a founder member of the Royal Society of Queensland of which he served as president in 1888–1889, and founder member and first vice-president of the Royal Australasian Ornithologists Union.

His principal work concerned the fossil birds of Queensland (Darling Downs) and southern Australia (Cooper Creek), but he also described a number of extant bird species. In fact, he was more successful at the latter, because due to insufficient knowledge of stratigraphy and evolution, he—like many ornithologists of his time—mistook subfossil remains of extant birds for the remains of extinct prehistoric species.

Among species he described were the white-winged robin in 1890, and  the frill-necked monarch in 1895.

De Vis also worked in the scientific field of herpetology, and he described many new species of reptiles. 

De Vis is commemorated in the scientific name of an Australian venomous snake, Denisonia devisi.

See also
:Category:Taxa named by Charles Walter De Vis

References

External links
De Vis Charles Walter — Brisbane City Council Grave Location Search

1829 births
1915 deaths
Alumni of Magdalene College, Cambridge
Australian ornithologists
Burials at Toowong Cemetery
Royal Society of Queensland
English emigrants to Australia